House at 352 Piermont Avenue is a historic home located at Piermont, Rockland County, New York. It was built about 1780, and is a -story, side-gabled, sandstone Colonial period residence. A two-story frame addition was built about 1970.  The house features a two-story, full-facade replacement porch.

It was listed on the National Register of Historic Places in 2015.

References

Houses on the National Register of Historic Places in New York (state)
Colonial architecture in New York (state)
Houses completed in 1780
Houses in Rockland County, New York
National Register of Historic Places in Rockland County, New York